Nazlı Gonca Vuslateri (born 2 September 1986) is a Turkish actress, columnist, screenwriter, poet, radio host and acting trainer.

Biography
She was born in Bursa on 2 September 1986. She has an older sister, musician Aslı Vuslateri and a stepbrother, Cem Vuslateri. She is of Turkish, Circassian, Abkhazian, Georgian, and Arab descent.

Since the age of nine, Gonca Vuslateri has studied acting (including kids theatre, Eric Morris, Susana Morris, Enis Fosforoğlu). She graduated from Theater Department of Müjdat Gezen Art Center. Gonca Vuslateri, who also worked at the "Dot" theatre. With a remarkable sense of psychology and humour she forcefully performed a wide range of characters in various genres, including comedy, drama. She played two different characters in comedy series Yalan Dünya simultaneously and won Golden Butterfly Awards Best Comedy Actress. The Best Actress of the year was chosen as her role "Şule" in series Anne by Hürriyet jury. She played in "Küçük Sırlar" Turkish remake of Gossip Girl. She played in Netflix sci-fi series "Sıcak Kafa".She played "Masha" by Anton Chekhov in  play Martı (The Seagull). During her theatre career, she won
two Afife Jale Play Awards and Sadri Alışık Award. She published "Manik Serçe" her poetry book. She wrote film "Cenazemize Hoşgeldiniz" and "Kırmızı Başlıklı Kız Uzayda" kids theater. She sometimes gives acting lesson.

She continues to writing in "Giriş Katın Bir Altı" of Hürriyet newspaper and to presenting "Giriş Katın Bir Altı" radio programme in NTV radio.

Due to her 75 years old Vasfiye character in Yalan Dünya, right shoulder of Gonca Vuslateri collapsed, her vocal chords were seriously damaged and her mandible ached. She regularly goes to physiotherapist, sound therapist. During an interview she has stated that her mother decided she and her older sister were going to be artist. But economic troubles forced them too hard. Her father was a petty officer and many of her family work in army. Gaffar Okkan, chief constable of Diyarbakır who was assassinated in an ambush is cousin of her grandfather.

Filmography

Screenwriter
Kırmızı Başlıklı Kız Uzayda
Cenazemize Hoşgeldiniz

Series
Eyvah Kızım Büyüdü (2000, Kanal D)
Aliye (2004, atv)
Büyük Buluşma (2004, Samanyolu TV) – Filiz
Kız Babası (2006)
Canım Ailem (2008–2010, atv) – Nurcan
Küçük Sırlar (2010–2011, Star TV) – Ceyla
Yerden Yüksek (2011, TRT 1) – Kumru
İbreti Ailem (2012, Star TV) – Yıldız
Yalan Dünya (2012–2014, Kanal D) – Eylem and Vasfiye
Gönül İşleri (2014, Star TV) – Kader
Anne (2016–2017, Star TV) – Şule
Tehlikeli Karım (2018) – Derin
Alya Vol 1 (2021) – Defne
Sıcak Kafa (2022, Netflix) – Yasemin

Cinema
Bornova Bornova – Hande (2009)
Kaybedenler Kulübü
Bizans Oyunları – 5. Klitorya IV (2016)
Düğüm Salonu (2018)
Hedefim Sensin  (2018)
Horoz Dövüşü (2022); Jeyan
Kuzenler Firarda (2022)
Allah Yazdıysa Bozsun (2022)
Her Şey Dahil (2022)
Cenazemize Hoşgeldiniz (2023)

Short filmKadife Çoraplar (2012)Ve Sonsuza Kadar Mutlu Yaşadılar (2012)

Music videos (as actress)
Pentagram - Gündüz Gece
Nazan Öncel - Aşkitom
Can Bonomo - Kara
Hayko Cepkin - Nikah Masası

Commercial
Media Markt (Vasfiye)
Axa Sigorta

Theatre
Artiz Mektebi
Bana Mastikayı Çalsana
Vur Yağmala YenidenPunk Rock – Simon Stephens – Tiyatro Dot – 2010Kabin – Kemal Hamamcıoğlu – Craft Tiyatro – 2013The Seagull – Anton Chekhov – Pürtelaş Tiyatro – 2017Erkek Arkadaşım Bir Feminist''

Discography
 "Sana Dair" (2016) with Tuna Kiremitçi
 "Hep Bi' Şey Eksik" (2020)

Books
Manik Serçe (2016)

Columnist
Giriş Katın Bir Altı

Radio
Giriş Katın Bir Altı

References

External links
Gonca Vuslateri on SinemaTürk 

1986 births
Turkish television actresses
Turkish film actresses
Living people
People from Bursa